Evan Evans may refer to:

Evan Alfred Evans (1876–1948), US judge
Evan Evans (racing driver) (born 1965), off-road champion racing in Championship Off-Road Racing
Evan Evans (academic) (1813–1891), Master of Pembroke College, Oxford and Vice-Chancellor of the University of Oxford
Evan Evans (poet) (1731–1789), Welsh poet and antiquary
Evan Evans (Ieuan Glan Geirionydd) (1795–1855), Welsh poet, hymnwriter and clergyman
Evan Evans (minister) (1804–1886), Welsh dissenting minister
Evan Evans (film composer) (born 1975), American film score composer
Evan Herber Evans (1836–1896), Welsh Nonconformist minister
Evan W. Evans, Wisconsin farmer-stockman and state assemblyman
Evan William Evans (1827–1874), Welsh-American mathematician
Evan Evans, a pseudonym of Frederick Schiller Faust (1892–1944), an American author known as Max Brand
Evan Evans, coach tour operator based in London, absorbed by Wallace Arnold in 1969
Evan Vincent Evans (1851–1934), journalist and promoter of the Welsh national revival
Evan Evans (footballer) (1903–1982), Welsh football wing half

See also
 Evans Evans (born 1936), American actress